Sir Harry Neil Marten PC (3 December 1916 – 22 December 1985) was a British Conservative Party politician.

Born in Lambeth, Marten was educated at Rossall School. During World War II he was parachuted into France as part of Operation Jedburgh to work with the French resistance and later served with the Norwegian resistance. He worked in the Foreign Office from 1947 to 1957 and was a solicitor and shipping advisor.

Marten was Member of Parliament for Banbury from 1959 to 1983 and served as a junior aviation minister 1962–64 and Overseas Development minister under Margaret Thatcher. Marten was a leading opponent of the European Economic Community. At the end of his time in Parliament, he was knighted on 6 January 1983. He died in Dorset aged 69.

He was a director of the private shipping and aircraft company Davies and Newman and was in office when it was floated on the London Stock Exchange in 1971 and had been associated with the company since 1962.

A keen raconteur, Marten told a story of a tour he took around the Palace of Westminster with his Banbury constituents. Touring through the maze of corridors they turned a corner and met Lord Hailsham, the Lord Chancellor, wearing the full regalia of his office. Recognising his Parliamentary colleague in the midst of the Banbury constituents, Hailsham boomed, "Neil". Not needing to be told again, the tour party fell to its knees with some haste.

References

Sources
 Times Guide to the House of Commons, 1966 & 1979

External links 
 

1916 births
1985 deaths
Conservative Party (UK) MPs for English constituencies
UK MPs 1959–1964
UK MPs 1964–1966
UK MPs 1966–1970
UK MPs 1970–1974
UK MPs 1974
UK MPs 1974–1979
UK MPs 1979–1983
Members of the Privy Council of the United Kingdom
People educated at Rossall School
Ministers in the Macmillan and Douglas-Home governments, 1957–1964